These are the Billboard Hot 100 number-one singles of 1970.

That year, 14 acts earned their first number one, such as B. J. Thomas, the Jackson 5, Shocking Blue, the Guess Who, Ray Stevens, Three Dog Night, the Carpenters, Bread, Edwin Starr, Neil Diamond, the Partridge Family, and Smokey Robinson and the Miracles. Diana Ross and George Harrison, having already hit number one with the Supremes and the Beatles, respectively, hit number one for the first time as solo acts. The Jackson 5 and the Beatles had more than one song hit number one that year, the Jackson 5 having the most with four, while the Beatles had two.

Chart history

Number-one artists

See also
 1970 in music
 Cashbox Top 100 number-one singles of 1970
 List of Billboard number-one singles

Sources
Fred Bronson's Billboard Book of Number 1 Hits, 5th Edition
Joel Whitburn's Top Pop Singles 1955-2008, 12 Edition
Joel Whitburn Presents the Billboard Hot 100 Charts: The Seventies
Additional information obtained can be verified within Billboard's online archive services and print editions of the magazine.

References

1970 record charts
1970